Levantine Arabic Sign Language, also known as Syro-Palestinian Sign Language, is the sign language used by Deaf and hearing people of Jordan, Palestine, Syria, and Lebanon. Although there are significant differences in vocabulary between the four states, this is not much greater than regional differences within the states. Grammar is quite uniform and mutual intelligibility is high, indicating that they are dialects of a single language.

The language typically goes by the name of the country, as so:
 Jordanian SL: لغة الإشارة الأردنية Lughat il-Ishārah il-Urduniyyah (LIU)
 Lebanese SL: لغة الإشارات اللبنانية Lughat al-Ishārāt al-Lubnāniyyah (LIL)
 Palestinian SL: لغة الاشارات الفلسطينية Lughat al-Ishārāt al-Filisṭīniyyah (LIF)
 Syrian SL: لغة الإشارة السورية Lughat il-Ishārah il-Sūriyyah (LIS)

References

Bibliography 
 
 

Arab sign languages
Languages of Jordan
Languages of the State of Palestine
Languages of Syria
Languages of Lebanon
Sign languages of Israel